Donald James Fraser (9 September 1882 – 18 July 1963) was an Australian rules footballer who played with Collingwood in the Victorian Football League (VFL).

A decade after his football career Fraser enlisted to serve in World War I, being gassed in France in 1918 and invalided back to England for treatment.

Notes

External links 

		
Don Fraser's profile at Collingwood Forever

1882 births
1963 deaths
Australian rules footballers from Victoria (Australia)
Collingwood Football Club players
Leopold Football Club (MJFA) players
Australian military personnel of World War I